Hussain Abdul-Hussain (Arabic: حسين عبدالحسين) is a Research Fellow at the Foundation for Defense of Democracies, a non-partisan organization in Washington. He previously worked as the Washington Bureau Chief of the Kuwaiti newspaper Al Rai (formerly Al Rai Alam).

Biography

Hussain Abdul-Hussain also worked for the US Congress-funded Arabic TV, Alhurra, as a news producer. Since 2017, Abdul-Hussain has maintained a weekly column with Alhurra digital. Prior to joining Alhurra, he worked as a reporter and later as editor for Beirut's The Daily Star  . He was in Baghdad in April/May 2003 where he reported on the downfall of the Saddam Hussein regime. He has contributed articles to the New York Times, The Washington Post, The Christian Science Monitor, the International Herald Tribune, the USA Today and the Baltimore Sun and has appeared on CNN, MSNBC and the BBC. He appears regularly on Arabic satellite TV stations.

Abdul-Hussain is a former Visiting Fellow with Chatham House, London.

Abdul-Hussain is a graduate of the American University of Beirut where he studied history of the Middle East.

His published Op-Eds:

The New York Times 

 A Vote of Thanks (2010)

 Now It is Up to US (2009)

 In Iraq, the Play was the Thing (2007)

 My First Day of Freedom (2003)

The Washington Post 

 Standing Up to Killers (2007)

The Christian Science Monitor 

 Two Faces of the Arab Street (2007)

The International Herald Tribune 

 Are they Leaving? An Email from Baghdad (2007)

 Meanwhile: Fearing a return of the bad old days (2007)

 Learning about the Enemy (2007)

The USA Today 

 Justice for Lebanon (2007)

Published Papers

Other Works

On August 24, 2019, Abdul-Hussain posted at his website:
"Ideas Beyond Borders asked me to write a forward to Bari Weiss’s book How to Fight Anti-Semitism, which the organization is translating to Arabic. The lines below are a rough translation to English of the forward that I wrote to address an Arabic-speaking audience..."

References

American University of Beirut alumni
Lebanese writers
Iraqi writers
21st-century Iraqi journalists
Lebanese journalists
Lebanese people of Iraqi descent 
Living people
Al Rai (Kuwaiti newspaper) people
Chatham House people
Iraqi essayists
Year of birth missing (living people)
Iraqi emigrants to Lebanon